FC Sokil Lviv was a football club based in Lviv, Lvivska Oblast, Ukraine.

History
The club was founded in 1960s and disappeared sometime after 1981. Following the fall of the Soviet Union, the club was revived as Sokil-LORTA (LORTA is the Lviv defence company).

Honors
Soviet Cup for collective teams of physical culture
 Holders (1): 1967

Ukrainian football championship among amateurs
 Winners (1): 1970
 Runners-up (1): 1973

Ukrainian Cup for collective teams of physical culture
 Holders: (2): 1973, 1974
 Finalists (1): 1969

Lviv Oblast football championship
 Winners (5): 1966, 1970, 1971, 1973, 1978
 Runners-up (3): 1972, 1974, 1976 (won or runner-up)

Lviv Oblast Cup
 Holders (2): 1978, 1992
 Finalists (1): 1965

See also
 LVVPU

References

 
Football clubs in Lviv
Defunct football clubs in Ukraine
Defunct football clubs in the Soviet Union
Association football clubs established in the 1960s
Association football clubs disestablished in 1981
1960s establishments in Ukraine
1981 disestablishments in Ukraine